323